Streptomyces glaucus is a species of bacterium in the genus Streptomyces.

See also 
 List of Streptomyces species

References

Further reading

External links
Type strain of Streptomyces glaucus at BacDive -  the Bacterial Diversity Metadatabase

glaucus
Bacteria described in 1986